Petru Toarca (born on October 4, 1975, Ozerne, Izmail Raion, Odesa Oblast, Ukraine) is a male freestyle wrestler from Romania. He participated in Men's freestyle 55 kg at 2008 Summer Olympics. In the 1/8 final he lost and was eliminated by Besarion Gochashvili from Georgia.

References

Trivia
 Toarca was the oldest wrestler in Men's freestyle 55 kg at 2008 Summer Olympics.

External links
 Wrestler bio on beijing2008.com

Living people
1975 births
Olympic wrestlers of Romania
Wrestlers at the 2008 Summer Olympics
Romanian male sport wrestlers
People from Odesa Oblast